Fairmilehead is a district of southern Edinburgh, Scotland. It lies approximately  due south of the city centre and borders Midlothian. The area comprises the neighbourhoods of Buckstone, Caiyside, Caiystane, Swanston, Frogston and Winton.

The centre of the area is the crossroads between Buckstone Terrace/Biggar Road and Frogston Road/Oxgangs Road. There was a Royal Bank of Scotland (closed October 2015) and there remains an accountant's office and a local convenience shop at the crossroads, as well as Fairmilehead Parish Church, which is a parish church of the Church of Scotland. Fairmile House Nursery and the nearby Morton Mains Farmhouse Nursery provide private childcare facilities suited to the exclusivity of the local community.

This area contains some of the most expensive houses in Edinburgh, with an average home value of £362,798 and the most expensive streets being Frogston Road West (average £955,118), Margaret Rose Loan (£595,298) and Galachlaw Shot (£586,754). In 2017, the area was named by the Edinburgh Evening News as being in the top four 'happiest places to live in Edinburgh', with a 96% satisfaction rate.

The eastern part of Fairmilehead contained the Princess Margaret Rose Orthopaedic Hospital from 1932 to 2002, when it was demolished to make way for new luxury housing. Recently, the Scottish Water Fairmilehead water treatment works have been converted into more high-end residential housing built by Cala and David Wilson Homes. Scottish Water retain offices there, adjacent to the Charwood Grill restaurant (previously Tusitaila Italian restaurant).

The area is represented by:

Scottish Parliament by Gordon MacDonald MSP (Scottish National Party), 
British Parliament by Ian Murray MP (Labour) 
On the City of Edinburgh Council (Colinton/Fairmilehead ward) by Cllrs Scott Arthur (Labour), Phil Doggart (Conservative) and Jason Rust (Conservative)

Ethnicity

References 

Areas of Edinburgh